Galela is the second most populous Papuan language spoken west of New Guinea, with some 80,000 speakers. Its dialects are Kadai (41,000), Morotai (24,000), Kadina (10,000), and Sopi (4,000). Its closest relative is the Loloda language.

Galela is spoken on the eastern side of the northern tip of Halmahera island (in Galela district and in neighbouring villages in Tobelo and Loloda districts), on Morotai Island to the north, on the Bacan and Obi islands to the south of Halmahera, and in scattered settlements along the southwest coast. All are in North Maluku province of Indonesia.

Phonology 

The following sound inventory is based on Shelden (1998).

Vowels 

Consonants 
Galela orthography largely follows Indonesian spelling conventions.

Grammar

Pronouns 

Galela has two free pronoun sets, and two sets of bound pronominal prefixes. The use of the pronominal prefixes is governed by semantic alignment: actor prefixes are used to index the S-argument of active intransitive verbs and the A-argument of transitive verbs, while undergoer prefixes index the S-argument of stative intransitive verbs and the P-argument of transitive verbs.

External links 
 Materials on Galela are included in the open access Arthur Capell collection (AC2) held by Paradisec.

References

Languages of Indonesia
North Halmahera languages